Louis J. D'Ambrosio is an American business executive who previously served chief executive officer of Sears Holdings Corporation. Prior to that, he was president and CEO of Avaya, responsible for the overall strategy, direction and operations of the corporation.

Early life and education
D'Ambrosio earned his Bachelor of Science from Pennsylvania State University (summa cum laude and Valedictorian) and received his MBA from Harvard Business School.

Career
D'Ambrosio joined IBM after college, working there for sixteen years. When he left the company in August 2002, he was responsible for worldwide sales and marketing for IBM's $12 billion software group.

In July 2006, he became president and chief executive officer at Avaya. He had been president, global sales and marketing at Avaya, and prior to that had been in charge of Avaya's $2 billion global services business unit, including network consulting, integration, maintenance and managed services.

In February 2011, Sears Holdings named D'Ambrosio chief executive officer and president. He had worked as a consultant to Sears' board for the previous six months. On January 7, 2013, it was announced that he will step down at the end of its fiscal year on February 2, 2013. On August 19, 2013, it was announced he would be chairman of the board for Sensus, based in Raleigh, North Carolina.

Other 

In February 2010, D'Ambrosio was elected to the board of trustees of the Jackson Laboratory, a nonprofit biomedical research institution in Bar Harbor, Maine.

References

Living people
American retail chief executives
Harvard Business School alumni
Pennsylvania State University alumni
Avaya employees
American technology chief executives
Year of birth missing (living people)